Calgary-Greenway is a provincial electoral district in Calgary, Alberta, Canada. The district was created in the 2010 boundary redistribution and is mandated to return a single member to the Legislative Assembly of Alberta using the first-past-the-post voting system.

The district includes the neighbourhoods of Taradale, Coral Springs, Monterey Park, Abbeydale, and Applewood Park.

History
The electoral district was created in the 2010 Alberta boundary re-distribution. It was created from parts of Calgary-Cross, Calgary-McCall and Calgary-Montrose which was completely abolished.

Boundary history

Electoral history

The antecedent electoral districts that comprise Calgary-Greenway have been returning Progressive Conservative candidates to office since the 1970s. Greenway was represented by Manmeet Bhullar until his death on November 23, 2015. He was first elected in a closely contested election in 2008 in the old riding of Calgary-Montrose. Prabhdeep Gill won the subsequent by-election for the PCs, which saw a slight increase in support for the Wildrose and a decrease of support for the Progressive Conservatives and the New Democrats from the 2015 election.

Legislature results

2016 by-election

2015 general election

2012 general election

Senate nominee results

2012 Senate nominee election district results

References

External links
Elections Alberta
Map of Calgary-Greenway constituency

Alberta provincial electoral districts
Politics of Calgary